Uganda has a number of music producers, both new and experienced. Some prominent producers:
Benon Mugumbya, Swangz Avenue
Paddy Man, Dreams Studios
Producer Hannz

References 

Lists of Ugandan people by occupation